Rajasekharan Parameswaran (born 1964), also known as Marthandam Rajasekharan, is an Indian art director and self-taught painter from Tamil Nadu. He holds two Guinness World Records.

Personal life
Born in 1964, Parameswaran lives in Kaliyikkavila, Kanyakumari, Tamil Nadu, India. He is married to Valsamma and has two daughters.

Career

Parameswaran worked as a statistics compiler, receptionist, medical representative, and a teacher before becoming an artist. He has no formal training in arts, he developed his own style and taught himself pencil sketching and oil-painting. Parameswaran made his debut in films as assistant director with Adoor Gopalakrishnan's film Nizhalkuthu. His first film as art director was the 2007 Naalu Pennungal, directed by Gopalakrishnan, for which he won a state award. Parameswaran has since acted as art director for a number of other films including Oru Pennum Randaanum, Maestro's Memoirs, Mohiniyattam, Magizhchi, and Pinneyum.

In 2008, Parameswaran received a Guinness World Record for creating the largest easel painting. It is a portrait of former chief minister of Kerala Elamkulam Namboodiripad, measuring 25' height and 50' width, and is held by a 56.5' high and 31' wide easel on National Highway 47 near Neyyattinkara, Thiruvananthapuram, Kerala. Two years later, it was included in the Limca Book of Records.

In 2017, Parameswaran built "The Largest Devil's Knot (Edakoodam)", a type of Burr puzzle, with each piece of the puzzle measuring 24' x 2' x 2', unveiled on 27 December 2017 at The Ravis Hotels and Resorts, Kollam, Kerala.

In 2010, he won the Bikhuram National Award for his painting of Mahatma Gandhi and the same year, for a painting of Fidel Castro, he won an online art contest organised by the ArtSlant International.

In 2015, his works were featured at Elegance Club, Kuala Lumpur, Malaysia, and included a portrait of Adhiletchumy Natrajan, titled Bliss. Bliss had previously been featured at the Vienna International Exhibition (2013). One of his paintings, Bhayanakam, was featured at Lalit Kala Akademi, Chennai, and sold. Parameswaran donated the proceeds to a relief fund for people affected by Cyclone Thane, which struck the Indian subcontinent in 2011.

Parameswaran has made portraits of Mother Teresa, Abdul Kalam, Richard Branson, and Najib Razak, among many others.

Filmography

Selected exhibitions
 2009 – Alshine Art Forum, group show, New Delhi
 2010 – International Contemporary art Festival, Daegu, Republic of Korea
 Lalit Kala Akademi, Chennai, organised by Ananda Vikatan
 2015 – ART NOW The Artists Fair London
 2015 – Memoirs Journey – at Elegance Club, Malaysia
 2016 – Oxford International Art Fair – representing Laksagi Art Gallery, Malaysia
 2016 – Symposium of Oil Painting Exhibition – 2016, Batu Gajah, Malaysia.
 2017 – Oil Painting Demo of Abdul Kalam at Indian Institute of Space Science and Technology (IIST) Trivandrum, India.
 2018 – Oil painting Demo of Elamkulam Namboodiripad at "EMS-ntey Lokam" – national Seminar at Wandoor, Malappuram, Kerala.
 2019 – Oil painting Demo of Lokanath Behera drawing-life-to-a-painting – Band stand, Museum, Thiruvananthapuram, Kerala.
 2019 – Chithra Sancharam-2019, the national level painting exhibition at Kerala Lalithakala Akademi Art Gallery, Vyloppilli Samskrithi Bhavan, Thiruvananthapuram.
 2019 – Chithra Sancharam-II, the national level painting exhibition-2019 at Kerala Lalithakala Akademi Art Gallery,Kozhicode.
 2019 – Solo Show-2019, 14 Oct to 30 Dec, Palaces of the Golden Horses , Jalan Kuda Emas, Mines Wellness City, 43300 Seri Kembangan, Malaysia
 2021 – OVIYAM Kerala Arts and Crafts Village, Kovalam, Trivandrum. 20 January

Gallery

References

External links

 
 Online galleries on RtistiQ

1964 births
Living people
Indian male painters
21st-century Indian painters
People from Kanyakumari district
Painters from Tamil Nadu
Indian portrait painters
Indian art directors
21st-century Indian male artists